Paul Bates may refer to:
 Paul Bates (cricketer) (born 1974), former English cricketer
 Paul L. Bates (1908–1995), United States Army officer